Aho is a Finnish surname meaning "glade". Notable people with the surname include:

 Alfred Aho (born 1941), Canadian computer scientist
 Bill Aho (born 1957), American businessman
 Esko Aho (born 1954), former prime minister of Finland
 Heikki Aho (1895–1961), Finnish film director, of Ako & Soldan film production company
 Heikki Aho (footballer) (born 1983), Finnish footballer
 Joni Aho (born 1986), Finnish footballer
Juhana Aho (born 1993), Finnish ice hockey player
 Juhani Aho (1861–1921), Finnish writer
 Jussi Halla-aho (born 1983), Finnish politician
 Kalevi Aho (born 1949), Finnish composer
 Martti Johannes Aho (1896–1986), Finnish colonel
 Ninos Aho (1945–2013), Assyrian poet and activist
 Paavo Aho (1891–1918), Finnish athlete
 Petri Aho, Finnish guitarist
 Sebastian Aho (ice hockey, born 1997), Finnish ice hockey player
 Sebastian Aho (ice hockey, born 1996), Swedish ice hockey player
 Susan Aho (born 1974), Finnish singer-songwriter and member of Värttinä
 Teppo Hauta-aho (born 1941), Finnish musician
 Tuomas Aho (born 1981), Finnish footballer
 Wayne Sulo Aho (1916–2006), American contactee

Finnish-language surnames